Anna Adeline Warouw Karamoy (23 February 1898 – 3 October 1979) was the second Indonesian woman to become a physician. She received her diploma from the School of Training of Native Doctors (STOVIA or School tot Opleiding van Indische Artsen) in 1924 and went on to specialize in otorhinolaryngology.

Biography 
Anna Warouw was born on 23 February 1898 in Amurang, which is located in the region of Minahasa in North Sulawesi. She started her medical studies at STOVIA in Batavia (now Jakarta) in 1914. She entered two years after Marie Thomas, who was the first female student to be accepted at STOVIA. Warouw graduated from STOVIA in 1924. She practiced medicine in several places including Gorontalo, Kudus, Makassar, Manado, and Semarang. She married Jean Eduard Karamoy who was also a physician and accompanied him to Europe where Karamoy studied for his doctorate degree. During the time, Warouw studied the field of otolaryngology at the University of Leiden.

References

Bibliography 

 

 

 

 

 

 

20th-century women physicians
1898 births
1979 deaths
Minahasa people
STOVIA alumni